Monument to Michael Jackson is a 2014 Serbian comedy film directed by Darko Lungulov. It was one of six films shortlisted by Serbia to be their submission for the Academy Award for Best Foreign Language Film at the 88th Academy Awards, but it lost out to Enclave.

Cast
 Boris Milivojevic as Marko
 Branislav Trifunovic as Dragan
 Toni Mihajlovski as Doki
 Natasa Tapuskovic as Ljubinka
 Dragan Bjelogrlic as Dusan
 Srdjan Miletic as Radio spiker and Tajkun Djordje
 Ljubomir Bandovic as Pop

References

External links
 

2014 films
2014 comedy films
Serbian comedy films
2010s Serbian-language films
Films set in Serbia
Cultural depictions of Michael Jackson